Leading Off is the debut solo album by American newgrass mandolinist Chris Thile, released on September 25, 1994 by Sugar Hill Records. Thile was 13 years old at the time of its release.

Track listing
"Shadow Ridge" (Thile) – 2:43
"Slime Rock" (Thile) – 4:54
"Holdin' Down The Fort" (Thile) – 3:00
"Faith River" (Thile) – 3:23
"Panhandle Rag" (Leon McAuliffe) – 3:16
"For All It's Worth" (Thile, Sean Watkins) – 2:01
"Shipwrecked" (Thile) – 2:34
"Trail's End" (Thile) – 3:35
"Salt Creek" (Traditional) – 2:49
"Old Dangerfield" (Bill Monroe) – 3:40
"Old Favorites Medley" (Traditional) – 4:19
"Chris Cross" (Thile) – 3:29
"How Great Thou Art" (Stuart Hine) – 3:17

Personnel

Musical
Chris Thile – fiddle, guitar, mandolin, arranger
Scott Thile – bass, engineer, facility consultant
Sean Watkins – mandolin 
Byron Berline – fiddle 
Dennis Caplinger – banjo 
Stuart Duncan – fiddle 
John Moore – guitar, mandolin 
Scott Nygaard – guitar 
Pete Wernick – Banjo, producer

Technical
Kurt Storey – Engineer
David Glasser – Mastering
Kevin Clock – Mixing
Bob Murray – Design

1994 debut albums
Chris Thile albums
Sugar Hill Records albums